The Municipal Court of Chicago was the name of two municipal courts that existed at separate times in during the history of the City of Chicago.

Municipal Court of Chicago (1837–1839)
The first Municipal Court of Chicago was formed in 1837 by the same act of the Government of Illinois that incorporated the City of Chicago. It was a court of general civil and criminal jurisdiction, operating concurrently with the Circuit Court in the city. It was abolished in 1839.

Municipal Court of Chicago (1906-1964)
In 1904, an amendment to the Illinois Constitution empowered the Illinois General Assembly to "pass an law (local, special or general) providing a scheme or charter of local municipal government for the territory now or hereafter embraced within the limits of the city of Chicago," and stated that, "in case the General Assembly shall create municipal courts in the city of Chicago it may abolish the offices of justices of the peace, police magistrates and constables in and for the territory within said city.” Soon after, an association known as the Chicago Charter Convention elected a committee to push the draft and passage of an act establishing municipal courts in the City of Chicago. A Municipal Court Act was passed by the General Assembly and was signed by Governor Charles S. Deneen on May 18, 1905. It was ratified by voters of Chicago on November 7, 1905. The court had jurisdiction over civil claims for money or property, as well as non-felony criminal cases. Further legislation was passed in 1906 and 1907 further enabling the court.

On November 6, 1906, an election was held to elect a chief justice and 27 associate justices. To provide for staggered future elections, the race saw separate elections divided by the duration of terms, with separate elections being held for sets of two-year, four-year, and six-year seats. 

The court commenced operation on December 3, 1906. It was seen as the first of its kind in the United States, and a model for many other municipal courts.

The creation of the court replaced the city's justice of the peace courts and removed the city from the jurisdiction of the remaining suburban justice of the peace courts in Cook County.

To accommodate the new court temporarily, the Municipal Courts Building was constructed on Michigan Avenue.

A 1964 amendment to the Illinois Constitution reorganized the courts of Illinois, and the Municipal Court of Chicago ceased to exist, with it and Cook County's other 161 courts being folded into the Cook County Circuit Court.

References

Government of Chicago
Courts in the United States
Chicago